504th may refer to:

504th Battlefield Surveillance Brigade (BfSB), located at Fort Hood, Texas
504th Bombardment Group (504th BG), a World War II United States Army Air Forces combat organization
504th Expeditionary Air Support Operations Group, active United States Air Force unit
504th Fighter Squadron or 137th Airlift Squadron flies the C-5 Galaxy and the C-17A Globemaster III
504th Infantry Regiment (United States) (504th PIR) is an airborne infantry regiment in the United States Army

See also
504 (number)
504, the year 504 (DIV) of the Julian calendar
504 BC